Karnataka State Rural Development and Panchayat Raj University (KSRDPRU) is a state university located at Gadag district, Karnataka, India. It was established in 2016 by the Government of Karnataka under the Karnataka State Rural Development and Panchayat Raj University Act, 2016 to focus on education towards rural development.

History
The decision of the Government of Karnataka to set up the university was announced in July 2013. An expert committee was constituted in December 2013, which was supposed to submit its recommendations in May 2014. However, the report was only submitted in February 2015. The Karnataka State Rural Development and Panchayat Raj University Bill, 2016 was passed in the Karnataka Legislative Assembly in March 2016, and in the Karnataka Legislative Council in July 2016. The first vice-chancellor (VC) of the university was B. Thimme Gowda, formerly VC of Bangalore University, which was in office until he retired in March 2018. In May 2020, Vishnukant S. Chatpalli was appointed VC.

References

External links

Rural development organisations in India
Universities in Karnataka
Education in Gadag district
Educational institutions established in 2016
2016 establishments in Karnataka